"Speak of the devil" is the short form of the English-language idiom "Speak of the devil and he doth appear" (or its alternative form "speak of the devil and he shall appear"). The form "talk of the devil" is also in  use in England. It is used when an object of discussion unexpectedly becomes present during the conversation. 
It can also be used about a topic that quickly becomes relevant, such as the onset of rain or a car breaking down. Used in this sense it can be seen as an alternative to the phrase "tempting fate".

The phrase may be traced back to the 16th century and for a long time it implied the prohibition of mentioning the devil. In the modern times it has lost its sinister meaning.

References

English-language idioms
Demonology
Destiny